The Narrow Neck Plateau, an eroded remnant of a sandstone layer situated at an elevation of  above sea level that is part of the Blue Mountains Range which is a spur line off the Great Dividing Range, is situated immediately south-west of  in New South Wales, Australia, located within the Blue Mountains National Park. The neck separates the Jamison Valley (to the east) from the Megalong Valley (to the west).

Description

From Cliff Drive, Katoomba, the Narrow Neck is accessed via a dirt road called Glenraphael Drive suitable for most two-wheel drive vehicles, subject to good weather conditions, as far as a locked gate. It is a popular walking, bike riding and climbing location and offers several walking descent routes to the adjacent valleys. Beyond the gate is walking/bicycle access only for the general public. This opens up the Jamison Valley for popular day walks to sites such as Mount Solitary and the Ruined Castle. Castle Head promontory points towards the Ruined Castle, a small rock formation between Castle Head and Mount Solitary. Arguably one of the best views on the eastern seaboard of NSW is from Narrow Neck Fire Tower. It also has excellent views back towards the escarpment at Katoomba.

Missing person
A nineteen-year-old British backpacker Jamie Neale was found alive after twelve days lost in the Blue Mountains. Two bushwalkers alerted emergency services who were conducting an extensive search using the Police Rescue Squad, police dogs, State Emergency Service and Rural Fire Service.

Fauna
Upland swamps on Narrow Neck Plateau have been identified as potential habitats for the rare Blue Mountain Water Skink.

Points of Interest

  - Cahill's Lookout
  - Carlons Head
  - Castle Head 
  - Clear Hill
  - Fire Tower 
  - Golden Staircase 
  - Locked Gate
  - Malaita Point
  - Narrow Neck Lookout
  - Ruined Castle 
  - Tarro's Ladders
  - Three Sisters Lookout

See also

List of mountains in New South Wales

References

External links

 Blue Mountains, NSW, Australia Aerial video footage of Narrow neck and the area around Katoomba.
 "Blue Mountains Wilderness", by Harry Loots. From the April 1997 issue of the newsletter of the Harbourside Group of SGAP.

Geography of the Blue Mountains (New South Wales)
Plateaus of Australia